The 1986 Men's Fistball World Championships was the 6th edition of the men's World Fistball Championships. It was held from 10 October to 12 October 1986 in Buenos Aires, Argentina.

Final standings

External links 
 Official Website

Fistball World Championships
F
Sports competitions in Buenos Aires